Yttrium boride refers to a crystalline material composed of different proportions of yttrium and boron, such as YB2, YB4, YB6, YB12, YB25, YB50 and YB66. They are all gray-colored, hard solids having high melting temperatures. The most common form is the yttrium hexaboride YB6. It exhibits superconductivity at relatively high temperature of 8.4 K and, similar to LaB6, is an electron cathode. Another remarkable yttrium boride is YB66. It has a large lattice constant (2.344 nm), high thermal and mechanical stability, and therefore is used as a diffraction grating for low-energy synchrotron radiation (1–2 keV).

YB2 (yttrium diboride)

Yttrium diboride has the same hexagonal crystal structure as aluminium diboride and magnesium diboride – an important superconducting material. Its Pearson symbol is hP3, space group P6/mmm (No 191), a = 0.33041 nm, c = 0.38465 nm and the calculated density is 5.05 g/cm3. In this structure, the boron atoms form graphite like sheets with yttrium atoms between them. YB2 crystals are unstable to moderate heating in air – they start oxidizing at 400 °C and completely oxidize at 800 °C. YB2 melts at ~2100 °C.

YB4 (yttrium tetraboride)

YB4 has tetragonal crystal structure with space group P4/mbm (No. 127), Pearson symbol tP20, a = 0.711 nm, c = 0.4019 nm, calculated density 4.32 g/cm3. High-quality YB4 crystals of few centimeters in size can be grown by the multiple-pass floating zone technique.

YB6 (yttrium hexaboride)
YB6 is a black odorless powder having density of 3.67 g/cm3; it has the same cubic crystalline structure as other hexaborides (CaB6, LaB6, etc., see infobox). High-quality YB6 crystals of few centimeters in size can be grown by the multiple-pass floating zone technique. YB6 is a superconductor with the relatively high transition temperature (onset) of 8.4 K.

YB12 (yttrium dodecaboride)
YB12 crystals have a cubic structure with density of 3.44 g/cm3, Pearson symbol cF52, space group Fmm (No. 225), a = 0.7468 nm. Its structural unit is 12 cuboctahedron. The Debye temperature of YB12 is ~1040 K, and it is not superconducting at temperatures above 2.5 K.

YB25

The structure of yttrium borides with B/Y ratio of 25 and above consists of a network of B12 icosahedra. The boron framework of YB25 is one of the simplest among icosahedron-based borides – it consists of only one kind of icosahedra and one bridging boron site. The bridging boron site is tetrahedrally coordinated by four boron atoms. Those atoms are another boron atom in the counter bridge site and three equatorial boron atoms of one of three B12 icosahedra. The yttrium sites have partial occupancies of ca. 60–70%, and the YB25 formula merely reflects the average atomic ratio [B]/[Y] = 25. Both the Y atoms and B12 icosahedra form zigzags along the x-axis. The bridging boron atoms connect three equatorial boron atoms of three icosahedra and those icosahedra make up a network parallel to the (101) crystal plane (x-z plane in the figure). The bonding distance between the bridging boron and the equatorial boron atoms is 0.1755 nm, which is typical for the strong covalent B-B bond (bond length 0.17–0.18 nm); thus, the bridging boron atoms strengthen the individual network planes. On the other hand, the large distance between the boron atoms within the bridge (0.2041 nm) reveals a weaker interaction, and thus the bridging sites contribute little to the bonding between the network planes.

YB25 crystals can be grown by heating a compressed pellet of yttria (Y2O3) and boron powder to ~1700 °C. The YB25 phase is stable up to 1850 °C. Above this temperature it decomposes into YB12 and YB66 without melting. This makes it difficult to grow a single crystal of YB25 by the melt growth method.

YB50
YB50 crystals have orthorhombic structure with space group P21212 (No. 18), a = 1.66251 nm, b = 1.76198 nm, c = 0.94797 nm. They can be grown by heating a compressed pellet of yttria (Y2O3) and boron powder to ~1700 0C. Above this temperature YB50 decomposes into YB12 and YB66 without melting. This makes it difficult to grow a single crystal of YB50 by the melt growth method. Rare earth elements from Tb to Lu can also crystallize in the M50 form.

YB66

YB66 was discovered in 1960 and its structure was solved in 1969. The structure is face-centered cubic, with space group Fmc (No. 226), Pearson symbol cF1936 and lattice constant a = 2.3440(6) nm. There are 13 boron sites B1–B13 and one yttrium site. The B1 sites form one B12 icosahedron and the B2–B9 sites make up another icosahedron. These icosahedra arrange in a thirteen-icosahedron unit (B12)12B12 which is called supericosahedron. The icosahedron formed by the B1 site atoms is located at the center of the supericosahedron. The supericosahedron is one of the basic units of the boron framework of YB66. There are two types of supericosahedra: one occupies the cubic face centers and another, which is rotated by 90°, is located at the center of the cell and at the cell edges. Thus, there are eight supericosahedra (1248 boron atoms) in the unit cell.

Another structure unit of YB66 is B80 cluster of 80 boron sites formed by the B10 to B13 sites. All those 80 sites are partially occupied and in total contain only ca. 42 boron atoms. The B80 cluster is located at the body center of the octant of the unit cell, i.e., at the 8a position (1/4, 1/4, 1/4); thus, there are eight such clusters (336 boron atoms) per unit cell. Two independent structure analyses  came to the same conclusion that the total number of boron atoms in the unit cell is 1584. The boron framework structure of YB66 is shown in the figure to the right. A schematic drawing under it indicates relative orientations of the supericosahedra, and the B80 clusters are depicted by light green and dark green spheres, respectively; at the top surface of the unit cell, the relative orientations of the supericosahedra are indicated by arrows. There are 48 yttrium sites ((0.0563, 1/4, 1/4) for YB62) in the unit cell. Fixing the occupancy of the Y site to 0.5 results in 24 Y atoms in the unit cell and the chemical composition of YB66; this occupancy of 0.5 implies that the yttrium pair has always one Y atom with one empty site.

YB66 has density 2.52 g/cm3, low thermal conductivity of 0.02 W/(cm·K), elastic constants c11 = 3.8×109 and c44 = 1.6×109 Newton/m2 and Debye temperature of 1300 K. As all yttrium borides, YB66 is a hard material and exhibits Knoop hardness of 26 GPa.
High-quality YB66 crystals of few centimeters in size can be grown by the multiple-pass floating zone technique and be used as X-ray monochromators.

The large unit cell of YB66 results in large lattice constant of 2.344 nm. This property, together with high thermal and mechanical stability resulted in application of YB66 as dispersive elements of X-ray monochromators for low energy radiation (1–2 keV).

See also
Crystal structure of boron-rich metal borides

References

Borides
Yttrium compounds